The Precision 14 is an American sailing dinghy that was designed by Stephen Seaton as a day sailer and first built in 1985.

Production
The design was built by Precision Boat Works in Palmetto, Florida, United States, starting in 1985, but it is now out of production.

Design
The Precision 14 is a recreational sailboat, built predominantly of fiberglass, with wood trim. It has a fractional sloop rig; a raked stem; a plumb transom; a transom-hung, kick-up rudder controlled by a tiller, with a hiking stick and a retractable centerboard. It displaces .

See also
List of sailing boat types

References

External links
Photo of a Precision 14
Photo of a Precision 14

Dinghies
1980s sailboat type designs
Sailing yachts
Sailboat type designs by Stephen Seaton
Sailboat types built by Precision Boat Works